The 30th Filmfare Awards were held on 25 September 1983.

Prem Rog led the ceremony with 12 nominations, followed by Nikaah with 11 nominations, and Bazaar and Shakti with 7 nominations each.

Prem Rog and Shakti won 4 awards each, thus becoming the most-awarded films at the ceremony, with the former winning Best Director (for Raj Kapoor) and Best Actress (for Padmini Kolhapure), and the latter winning Best Film and Best Actor (for Dilip Kumar).

Amitabh Bachchan received triple nominations for Best Actor for his performances in Bemisaal, Namak Halaal and Shakti, but lost the award to Dilip Kumar, who won the award for a record 8th time for his performance in Shakti.

Main awards

Best Film
 Shakti 
Bazaar
Nikaah
Prem Rog
Vidhaata

Best Director
 Raj Kapoor – Prem Rog 
B. R. Chopra – Nikaah
Ramesh Sippy – Shakti
Sagar Sarhadi – Bazaar
Subhash Ghai – Vidhaata

Best Actor
 Dilip Kumar – Shakti 
Amitabh Bachchan – Bemisaal
Amitabh Bachchan – Namak Halaal
Amitabh Bachchan – Shakti
Naseeruddin Shah – Bazaar
Rishi Kapoor – Prem Rog
Sanjeev Kumar – Angoor

Best Actress
 Padmini Kolhapure – Prem Rog 
Raakhee – Shakti
Rekha – Jeevan Dhaara
Salma Agha – Nikaah
Smita Patil – Bazaar

Best Supporting Actor
 Shammi Kapoor – Vidhaata 
Girish Karnad – Teri Kasam
Sanjeev Kumar – Vidhaata
Shashi Kapoor – Namak Halaal
Vinod Mehra – Bemisaal

Best Supporting Actress
 Supriya Pathak – Bazaar 
Kiran Vairale – Namkeen
Nanda – Prem Rog
Ranjeeta – Teri Kasam
Waheeda Rehman – Namkeen

Best Comic Actor
 Deven Verma – Angoor 
Ashok Kumar – Shaukeen
Jagdeep – Ghazab
Mehmood – Khud-Daar
Utpal Dutt – Shaukeen

Best Story
 Namkeen – Samaresh Basu 
Bazaar – Sagar Sarhadi
Nikaah – Dr. Achla Nagar
Prem Rog – Kamna Chandra
Shakti – Salim–Javed

Best Screenplay
 Shakti – Salim–Javed

Best Dialogue
 Nikaah – Dr. Achla Nagar

Best Music Director 
 R. D. Burman – Sanam Teri Kasam 
Bazaar – Khayyam
Namak Halaal – Bappi Lahiri
Nikaah – Ravi
Prem Rog – Laxmikant–Pyarelal

Best Lyricist
 Prem Rog – Santosh Anand for Mohabbat Hai Kya Cheez 
Namak Halaal – Anjaan & Prakash Mehra for Pag Ghungroo
Nikaah – Hasan Kamal for Dil Ke Armaan
Nikaah – Hasan Kamal for Dil Ke Yeh Arzoo
Prem Rog – Amir Qazalbash for Meri Kismat Mein Tu

Best Playback Singer – Male 
 Namak Halaal – Kishore Kumar for Pag Ghungroo 
Prem Rog – Suresh Wadkar for Main Hoon Prem Rogi
Prem Rog – Suresh Wadkar for Meri Kismat Mein Tu
Teri Kasam – Amit Kumar for Yeh Zameen Gaa Rahi Hai

Best Playback Singer – Female 
 Nikaah – Salma Agha for Dil Ke Armaan 
Nikaah – Salma Agha for Dil Ki Yeh Arzoo
Nikaah – Salma Agha for Faza Bhi Hai Jawaan
Star – Nazia Hassan for Boom Boom
Yeh Nazdeekiyan – Anuradha Paudwal for Maine Ek Geet Likha Hai

Best Art Direction
 Namkeen – Ajit Nanerjee

Best Cinematography
 Bemisaal – Jaywant Pathare

Best Editing
 Prem Rog – Raj Kapoor

Best Sound
 Shakti – P. Harikishan

Critics' Awards

Best Documentary
 Experience India

Biggest Winners
Prem Rog – 4/12
Shakti – 4/8
 Bazaar – 1/7
Nikaah – 2/11
Namkeen – 2/4
Namak Halaal – 1/5

See also
Filmfare Awards

References

External links
IMDb

Filmfare Awards
Filmfare